Carex dickinsii, also known as Dickins' sedge or chao xian tai cao in pinyin, is a tussock-forming species of perennial sedge in the family Cyperaceae. It is native to parts of Japan, Taiwan and south-eastern China.

Description
The sedge has a rhizome and forms slender stems that arise from underground. The culms have yellow to brown coloured sheaths at there base. The leaves have sheathed and transverse nodes that are compartmentalied between the veins. It has leaflike bracts that appear in a whorl underneath the inflorescences.

Taxonomy
The species was first described by the botanists Adrien René Franchet and Ludovic Savatier in 1878 as a part of the work Enumeratio Plantarum in Japonia Sponte Crescentium

It has one synonym; Carex coreana described by Liberty Hyde Bailey in 1889.

Distribution
The sedge is found in temperate areas of eastern Asia, from Japan in the north, Korea and the Fujian province of Chine in the south.

See also
List of Carex species

References

dickinsii
Taxa named by Adrien René Franchet
Taxa named by Ludovic Savatier
Plants described in 1878
Flora of Japan
Flora of Taiwan
Flora of China